Kanaala Nanjunda Tirumala Sastry (5 September 1945 – 13 September 2018) was an Indian film critic, screenwriter, director, littérateur, and producer, known for his works predominantly in Telugu cinema. He has garnered six National Film Awards, three Nandi Awards and three International honors.

He served as chairman of critics Jury at National Film Awards.  Sastry was a Jury Member of Vladivostok International Film Festival 2003; Five time Jury Member for Indian Panorama-International Film Festival of India; Jury Member the Nandi Awards, Government of Andhra Pradesh, and Fipresci Jury Member at Kinotavr film festival and Busan International Film Festival.

Sastry's Thilaadanam received "New Currents Award" at the 7th Busan International Film Festival. He worked on many research projects with veteran director B. Narsing Rao. Sastry's English Documentary Harvesting Baby Girls won the Special Jury Award at International Documentary Film Festival Amsterdam.

Noted publications
Chittoor V. Nagaiah: A Monologue
Nalo Nenu a Monologue of Bhanumathi Ramakrishna
Alanti Chalanchitram First 25 Years of Telugu cinema

Filmography

Awards
National Film Awards
Best Film Critic - 1989
Best Book on Cinema (Publisher) - 1993 
Special Jury Award / Special Mention - Book on Cinema - 1995
Best Ethnographic Film - 1999
Best Debut Film of a Director - 2002
Best Feature Film in Telugu - 2007

International Honours
Special Jury Award, Harvesting Baby Girls, at International Documentary Film Festival Amsterdam
New Currents Award at the 7th Busan International Film Festival in South Korea
Fipresci Jury Member at Kinotavr film festival and Busan International Film Festival

Nandi Awards
Best First Film of a Director - Thilaadanam (2001)
First Best Documentary Film  - Surabhi (1999)
Best Book on Telugu Cinema - Alanati Chalana Chitram (1995)

References

1945 births
2018 deaths
Indian film critics
20th-century Indian film directors
Telugu film directors
Indian documentary filmmakers
Indian documentary film directors
Indian experimental filmmakers
Indian male screenwriters
Film directors from Andhra Pradesh
Screenwriters from Andhra Pradesh
Telugu screenwriters
Nandi Award winners
Director whose film won the Best Debut Feature Film National Film Award
Best Critic National Film Award winners